The 2012 ITF Men's Circuit is the 2012 edition of the entry level tour for men's professional tennis, and is the third tier tennis tour below the Association of Tennis Professionals, World Tour and Challenger Tour. It is organised by the International Tennis Federation (ITF) who additionally organizes the ITF Women's Circuit which is an entry level tour for women's professional tennis. Future tournaments are organized to offer either $10,000 or $15,000 in prize money and tournaments which offering hospitality to players competing in the main draw give additional ranking points which are valid under the ATP ranking system, and are to be organized by a national association or approved by the ITF Men's Circuit Committee.

The tournaments are played on a rectangular flat surface, commonly referred to as a tennis court. Tennis is played on a variety of surfaces and each surface has its own characteristics which affect the playing style of the game. There are four main types of courts depending on the materials used for the court surface, clay, hard, grass and carpet courts with the ITF classifying five different pace settings ranging from slow to fast.

Participating host nations

Countries that are hosting a tournament in 2012, but did not in 2011.

Schedule

Key

January–March

April–June

July–September

October–December

Point distribution

Notes

References
General

Specific

External links
International Tennis Federation official website

 
2012
ITF Men's Circuit